Montes Aquilanos, also known as Montes de El Bierzo and Alpes Bergidenses, is a mountain range within Montes de León, located to the south-southeast of the region of El Bierzo, pertaining to the Province of León in the autonomous region of Castile and León, Spain.
It serves as border between the traditional counties of Valdueza, Bierzo Bajo, La Somoza and La Cabrera.

Aquilanos